Events from the year 1828 in Russia

Incumbents
 Monarch – Nicholas I

Events

 Aghdam
 
  
  
 
 
 
 
 Battle of Akhalzic
 Russo-Turkish War (1828–29)
 Office of the Institutions of Empress Maria

Births

Leo Tolstoy

Deaths

References

1828 in Russia
Years of the 19th century in the Russian Empire